Jatayu could mean:

 Jatayu (Ramayana), the bird in the Hindu epic Ramayana
 Jatayu (book), a collection of poems by Sitanshu Yashaschandra
 Jatayu Airlines, an Indonesian airline company
 Lalmohan Ganguly, alias Jatayu, a character in the Feluda stories by Satyajit Ray
 Garakamanthana Palya, a neighbourhood in Bangalore named after Garakamanthana, another name of Jatayu.